Lorn may refer to:

Places
 Lorn, New South Wales, a suburb of Maitland, New South Wales, Australia
Firth of Lorn, body of water off Scotland
Lorn Rocks, rocks in Antarctica
An alternate spelling for Lorne, Scotland

People
 Lorn (musician), an American electronic musician 
 Lorn Brown (c.1938 - 2010), American sports broadcaster
 Lorn, the mate of Tragg in Tragg and the Sky Gods mid-1970s comic book

See also

 Lorne (disambiguation)